Nadia Ejjafini (born 8 November 1977) is a Moroccan-born professional long-distance runner. She switched nationality from her birth country to Bahrain in 2003, and later became an Italian citizen by marriage in 2009.

Biography
She finished fourth in the 5000 metres at the 1998 World Junior Championships. She won the half marathon race at the 1999 Pan Arab Games, at the time representing Morocco. She won the Giro di Castelbuono race in 2002.

Ejjafini competed at the World Cross Country Championships in 2003 and 2004 and in the marathon at the World Championships in 2003 and 2005. She also competed in the marathon at the 2004 and 2008 Summer Olympics, but did not finish on either attempt. She was fourth over 5000 m at the 2006 Asian Games.

She enjoyed much success on the road circuit in 2006: she won the Tilburg Ten Miles, Diecimiglia del Garda, Parelloop, Circuito Podistico and Rome-Ostia Half Marathon that year. She also took consecutive victories at both the Corrida de Langueux and Corrida de Houilles 10K races in 2006 and 2007.

Representing Bahrain, she took a 5000 m silver medal and 10,000 m bronze medal at the 2007 Military World Games and won the bronze at the 2007 Asian Cross Country Championships. At the Athletics at the 2007 Pan Arab Games, she was the 10,000 m gold medallist.

She gained Italian citizenship in September 2009 by marriage. That year she was the winner at the Singelloop Utrecht. She won her first national title at the 2011 Italian Athletics Championships over 10,000 m. She came second at the Cross della Vallagarina in January 2011, finishing behind Ethiopian runner Fente Alemu Birtukan. She represented Italy internationally for the first time at the 2011 IAAF World Cross Country Championships, coming 34th overall. The following month she took part in the Great Ireland Run and reached the top three.

She won the Cremona Half Marathon in October with a career best run of 1:08:27 hours and a personal best of 2:26:15 in the marathon followed, as she was sixth at the Frankfurt Marathon. At November's Cross Internacional Valle de Llodio she won the 7.64 km race with half a minute to spare. She was in contention for a medal for much of the race at the 2011 European Cross Country Championships, but was edged into fourth late on by Gemma Steel. At the Cross de Venta de Baños later that month she was runner-up behind Priscah Jepleting. In her last race of the year, she came fourth at the Saint Silvester Road Race. She improved her 10K best to 31:52 minutes at the Great Manchester Run in May 2012, taking second place behind Linet Masai.

Personal bests
5000 metres - 15:16.54 min (2012)
10,000 metres - 31:45:14 min (2012)
Half marathon - 1:08:27 hrs (2011)
Marathon - 2:26:15 hrs (2011)

Achievements

See also
Italian all-time lists - 5000 metres
Italian all-time lists - 10000 metres
Italian all-time lists - Half marathon
Italian all-time lists - Marathon

References

External links
 

1977 births
Living people
Bahraini female long-distance runners
Moroccan female long-distance runners
Italian female long-distance runners
Italian female marathon runners
Athletes (track and field) at the 2004 Summer Olympics
Athletes (track and field) at the 2012 Summer Olympics
Olympic athletes of Bahrain
Olympic athletes of Italy
Naturalised citizens of Italy
Moroccan emigrants to Italy
Italian sportspeople of African descent
Athletics competitors of Gruppo Sportivo Esercito
Athletes (track and field) at the 2006 Asian Games
Moroccan female marathon runners
Moroccan emigrants to Bahrain
Asian Games competitors for Bahrain
Italian female cross country runners